The Kita River is a river in Shiga Prefecture and Fukui Prefecture, Japan. It is designated Class A by the Ministry of Land, Infrastructure, Transport and Tourism (MLIT).

References

Rivers of Shiga Prefecture
Rivers of Fukui Prefecture
Rivers of Japan